William Findlay (17 February 1900 – 11 June 1949) was a Scottish professional association football player and manager, most closely associated with Watford.

Career
Born in Wishaw, Lanarkshire, Findlay started his career playing for Musselburgh Bruntonians, where he won the Scottish Junior Cup and represented Scotland at junior level, then moved on to Third Lanark in the Scottish Football League's top division in 1923. A year later Third Lanark sold Findlay to English club Liverpool for a fee of £2,500, however he made no first team appearances in his single season at Anfield, and he subsequently played for Leicester City for seven years, and finally Watford, whom he also managed between 1938 and 1947.

During his tenure as manager, Watford finished fourth in the Football League Third Division South in consecutive seasons in 1937–38 and 1938–39, before the interruption of competitive football in England due to the Second World War. Although primarily the club's manager, Findlay occasionally made wartime appearances for Watford due to player shortages, playing his final game for the club at the age of 44. He became manager of Enfield in 1947, a post that he held until his death two years later.

His brother Alex was also a footballer who played for Wrexham, Bristol Rovers, Cheltenham Town and Evesham Town.

Managerial statistics

Statistics are for Football League games only.

See also
 List of Watford F.C. managers
 List of Watford F.C. players
 History of Watford F.C.

References

External links
 Soccerbase statistics

1900 births
Sportspeople from Wishaw
Sportspeople from Midlothian
Scottish footballers
Musselburgh Athletic F.C. players
Third Lanark A.C. players
Liverpool F.C. players
Leicester City F.C. players
Watford F.C. players
Scottish Junior Football Association players
Scotland junior international footballers
Scottish Football League players
English Football League players
English Football League managers
Scottish football managers
Watford F.C. managers
Enfield F.C. managers
1949 deaths
Association football wing halves
Footballers from North Lanarkshire